Government Degree College Patushay Bandipora (Urdu;) also known as HKM (Hassan Khoyihami Memorial College), GDC Bandipora, is University Grants Commission autonomous co-educational degree college affiliated with the University of Kashmir situated in Bandipora in the Indian union territory of Jammu and Kashmir.The college is affiliated with University of Kashmir, Hazratbal Srinagar and is recognised by University Grants Commission of India under articles 2(f) and 12(b) of UGC Act, 1956. The college is accredited with NAAC Grade - B.

Location
The college is located at Patushay in district headquarter, Bandipora in the Indian union territory of Jammu and Kashmir. It is located in North-Kashmir and situated at a distance of 57 km from Srinagar on the eastern bank of Wular Lake.

Establishment
Government of Jammu and Kashmir established the college in the year 2005 during the Chief-Ministership of Mufti Mohammad Sayeed. The college is one of the first institution of higher education in district Bandipora. The main aim of establishment of college was to open the doors of higher education to students belonging to far-flung hilly areas of district Bandipora.

About 

Government Degree College, Bandipora is also known as HKM (Hassan Khoyihami Memorial College) GDC Bandipora.It is named after the Hassan Khoyihami, a great native poet and historian of 19th century in Kashmir, who provided information on all aspects of human life, geography, flora, fauna and archaeological remains of Kashmir.

Courses offered 
The college offers bachelor courses in Arts, Science and Commerce streams.

Bachelor courses 

 Bachelors in Arts
 Bachelors in Arts (with Computer)
 Bachelors in Science (Medical)
 Bachelors in Science (Non-Medical)
 Bachelors in Science (with Computer)
 Bachelors in Commerce (B.Com.)

References 

Colleges affiliated to University of Kashmir
Degree colleges in Kashmir Division
Universities and colleges in Jammu and Kashmir
2005 establishments in Jammu and Kashmir
Educational institutions established in 2005